1 Chronicles 5 is the fifth chapter of the Books of Chronicles in the Hebrew Bible or the First Book of Chronicles in the Old Testament of the Christian Bible. The book is compiled from older sources by an unknown person or group, designated by modern scholars as "the Chronicler", and had the final shape established in late fifth or fourth century BCE. This chapter focuses on the Transjordanian tribes, geographically from south to north: Reuben (verses 1–10), Gad (verses 11–17) and the half tribe of Manasseh (verses 23–24), as well as the account of the war against the Hagrites (verses 10, 18–22) and the reasoning why Transjordanian tribes were taken away into exile (verses 25–26). It belongs to the section focusing on the list of genealogies from Adam to the lists of the people returning from exile in Babylon (1 Chronicles 1:1 to 9:34).

Text
This chapter was originally written in the Hebrew language. It is divided into 26 verses in English Bibles, but counted to 41 verses in Hebrew Bible using a different verse numbering (see below).

Verse numbering
There are some differences in verse numbering of this chapter in English Bibles and Hebrew texts as follows:

This article generally follows the common numbering in Christian English Bible versions, with notes to the numbering in Hebrew Bible versions.

Textual witnesses
Some early manuscripts containing the text of this chapter in Hebrew are of the Masoretic Text tradition, which includes the Aleppo Codex (10th century), and Codex Leningradensis (1008).

There is also a translation into Koine Greek known as the Septuagint, made in the last few centuries BCE. Extant ancient manuscripts of the Septuagint version include Codex Vaticanus (B; B; 4th century), and Codex Alexandrinus (A; A; 5th century).

Old Testament references
: ; ;

Structure
The whole chapter belongs to an arrangement comprising 1 Chronicles 2:3–8:40 with the king-producing tribes of Judah (David;
2:3–4:43) and Benjamin (Saul; 8:1–40) bracketing the series of lists as the priestly tribe of Levi (6:1–81) anchors the center, in the following order:
A David's royal tribe of Judah (2:3–4:43)
B Northern tribes east of Jordan (5:1–26)
X The priestly tribe of Levi (6:1–81)
B' Northern tribes west of Jordan (7:1–40)
A' Saul's royal tribe of Benjamin (8:1–40)

Descendants of Reuben (5:1–10)
This section begins with explanation (a kind of midrash) that Reuben did not receive the rights of a firstborn son of Jacob because he slept with Bilhah, his father's concubine (cf. ). The firstborn rights were passed on to the two sons of Joseph, whereas the leadership was given to Judah (underlined in verse 2 and reflected in its prominence in the lists of tribes themselves) with an unnamed "chief ruler" (certainly pointing to David). Reuben's four sons are only named in verse 4.

Verse 1
Now the sons of Reuben the firstborn of Israel—he was indeed the firstborn, but because he defiled his father's bed, his birthright was given to the sons of Joseph, the son of Israel, so that the genealogy is not listed according to the birthright;
Cross references: ; 
"Given to the sons of Joseph": Some ancient Hebrew manuscripts, the Syriac and Arabic translations read "to Joseph". This transfer of primogeniture rights refers to Jacob's curse (to Reuben, Jacob's biological firstborn) that the special blessing was given to Joseph (Genesis 49:22-26) and of his two sons (representing two parts of inheritance for the firstborn; Genesis 48:15-20), where Ephraim later emerges as the leading tribe of the two (Judges 2:9; Judges 4:5; Judges 5:14; Judges 8:1-2; Judges 12:1; Judges 12:15).

Verse 2
For Judah prevailed above his brethren, and of him came the chief ruler; but the birthright was Joseph's:).
"The chief ruler": literally "[to be] prince", an apparent reference to David (1 Samuel 13:14), which was from the tribe of Judah, but later also alluded by the apostolic writer of the Epistle to the Hebrews for Jesus Christ: "It is evident that our Lord sprang out of Judah" (Hebrews 7:14).
"Birthright": or "the right of the firstborn", was Joseph's, who received the "double portion" in the land portions of Ephraim and Manasseh, his sons.

Verse 6
Beerah his son, whom Tilgathpilneser king of Assyria carried away captive: he was prince of the Reubenites.

Descendants of Gad (5:11–17)
This section focuses on the tribe of Gad, which settled in the area east of the Jordan river ("Transjordan"), along with the tribes of Reuben and Manasseh (half of the tribe). The sources of the genealogies of the descendants of Gad are the documents compiled during the reign of Jotham, King of Judah (c. 750–735 BCE), and Jeroboam, King of Israel (c. 793–753 BCE), that bear no resemblance to other parts of the Bible (cf.).

Verse 16
And they dwelt in Gilead in Bashan, and in her towns, and in all the suburbs of Sharon, upon their borders.
"Suburbs": "pasturelands" (ESV, NASB, NIV, etc.), "common-lands" or "open lands" (NKJV).
"Sharon": is not the same area as the identically named plain south of Carmel, but a Transjordanian region (its precise position uncertain), which is also mentioned on the inscription of Mesha, king of Moab (line 13; dated around 830–810 BCE).

The war against the Hagrites (5:18–22)

Descendants of Manasseh (5:23–24)
This section focuses on the half-tribe of Gad, which settled in the area east of the Jordan river ("Transjordan"), along with the tribes of Reuben and Gad.

The exile of Transjordanian tribes (5:25–26)
This passage combines the two-phases of the northern Israel kingdom ( and) into a single exile of the Transjordanian tribes, by taking the name of the king from the first, whilst using the deportation place-names of the second phase. Historical documents only record that Tiglath-pileser conquered Gilead in the east of Jordan.

Verse 26
And the God of Israel stirred up the spirit of Pul king of Assyria, and the spirit of Tilgathpilneser king of Assyria, and he carried them away, even the Reubenites, and the Gadites, and the half tribe of Manasseh, and brought them unto Halah, and Habor, and Hara, and to the river Gozan, unto this day.
"The spirit of Pul king of Assyria, and the spirit of Tilgathpilneser king of Assyria": also translated as "the spirit of Pul, king of Assyria, that is, the spirit of Tilgath-pilneser king of Assyria" (NASB).

See also

Related Bible parts: Genesis 46, Exodus 6, Numbers 3, Numbers 26, Judges 2, Judges 12, 2 Kings 15, 2 Kings 16, 2 Kings 17, 2 Kings 18, 2 Chronicles 28

Notes

References

Sources

External links
 Jewish translations:
 Divrei Hayamim I - I Chronicles - Chapter 5 (Judaica Press) translation [with Rashi's commentary] at Chabad.org
 Christian translations:
 Online Bible at GospelHall.org (ESV, KJV, Darby, American Standard Version, Bible in Basic English)
 First Book of Chronicles Chapter 5. Bible Gateway

05